The Treens are fictional aliens in the Dan Dare stories. They first appeared in Dan Dare: The First Story, which was serialised in the Eagle comic magazine from Volume 1, Number 1 (14 April 1950) to Volume 2, Number 25 (28 September 1951). The story was drawn by Frank Hampson.

Fictional background
The Treens are a race of green-skinned humanoids from the northern hemisphere of the planet Venus. The southern hemisphere is inhabited by the Therons, a human-like race with an obvious affinity to humanity on Earth. The Treens share the northern hemisphere with the  Atlantines, a blue-skinned people whose ancestors came from Earth 100,000 years previously. The two hemispheres are separated by the "flamelands" around the equator which are impassable, except by specially equipped aircraft.

The leader of the Treens is The Mekon, an individual specifically engineered to have a high intelligence. The Treens are portrayed as mostly unemotional without the usual human feelings about the sanctity of life. In ancient times, they lived as savage jungle tribes permanently involved in tribal wars amongst themselves, until in a major war the Therons occupied the northern hemisphere by force in an attempt to civilize the Treens. The attempt failed and the Therons later abandoned the Treens to their own devices.

The first Mekon was soon after developed by Treen scientists as a "super-brain" to rule the Treen race. The Mekon transformed Treen society into a highly organized militaristic logic-based society whose orders are obeyed without question, and which is typically in a hostile relationship with the Therons and Earth, both of whose lands they have occasionally occupied. Treens typically don't pay attention to the Atlantines, who endure substandard living conditions.
	 
Mekonta is the capital city of the Treens in the Dan Dare stories. It is named after The Mekon. It is built on many islands in a lake. Its design may have been inspired by Venice and/or Tenochtitlan. It was ruined in the war in Dan Dare: The First Story, and New Mekonta was built nearby. Afterwards for a long time Old Mekonta remained uncleared ruins.
	 
The Magnets of Mekonta are huge electromagnets on mountaintops around Mekonta. They are used to raise and lower spaceships in and out of Mekonta.

Political interpretation
Creator Frank Hampson stated, "Basically we were fighting the Second World War again – the Treens were the Nazis."

Other appearances
A Treen was briefly seen in Scarlet Traces: The Great Game. A Treen was seen drinking at the Star Stop diner in Marvel Comic's She-Hulk (4-7).
Inky schoolboy Nigel Molesworth on being caught smoking, remarked "You have caught me Sir, like a Treen in a disabled spaceship."
In the universe of The League of Extraordinary Gentlemen, the Treens enter an alliance with Earth as of 1969, and schools where they are taught English are established. In 2009, however, relations have intensified.

References

External links
 An "official" history of the Treens and their leader the Mekon
 DanDare.Org website

Comics characters introduced in 1950
Dan Dare
Fiction set on Venus
Fictional reptilians